Tideman is a surname. Notable people with the surname include:

Bruno Tideman (1834-1883), Dutch naval engineer
Magnus Tideman (born 1963), former professional tennis player from Sweden
Nicolaus Tideman (born 1943), Professor of Economics at Virginia Polytechnic Institute and State University
Robert Tideman of Winchcombe (died 1401), medieval Bishop of Llandaff and Bishop of Worcester
Serena Tideman, US born composer and classical and improvisational cellist who resides in Port Townsend, Washington

See also
Tideman Johnson Natural Area, city park of about 7.7 acres (3.1 ha) in southeast Portland, in the U.S. state of Oregon